Ayumi Kawasaki (born 27 July 1984) is a Japanese professional vert skater. She is the youngest person to ever medal in aggressive inline skating at the X Games, claiming bronze in the women's vert competition at the 1997 Summer X Games when she was twelve years old.

Kawasaki started skating when she was 9 in 1993 and turned professional in 1996. Kawasaki has attended and ranked high in many competitions in her vert skating career.

Best Tricks McTwist 1080, McTwist 900

Competitions 

Sources:

References

External links
skatelog.com
lgactionsports.com
rollernews.com
skatelog.com
espn.go.com
skatelog.com
skatelog.com
skatelog.com
skatelog.com
skatelog.com
skatelog.com
espneventmedia.com
espneventmedia.com
espneventmedia.com
rollingupdates.com
whatiexpect.in

1984 births
Living people
Sportspeople from Osaka
Japanese sportswomen
Vert skaters
X Games athletes